The Golden Bell Award for Best Editing for a Drama Series is one of the categories of the competition for Taiwanese television production, Golden Bell Awards. It has been awarded since 1980.

Winners

2020s

References

Editing for a Drama Series, Best
Golden Bell Awards, Best Editing for a Drama Series